Tornado myths are incorrect beliefs about tornadoes, which can be attributed to many factors, including stories and news reports told by people unfamiliar with tornadoes, sensationalism by news media, and the presentation of incorrect information in popular entertainment. Common myths cover various aspects of the tornado, and include ideas about tornado safety, the minimization of tornado damage, and false assumptions about the size, shape, power, and path of the tornado itself.

Some people incorrectly believe that opening windows ahead of a tornado will reduce the damage from the storm. Some people also believe that escaping in a vehicle is the safest method of avoiding a tornado, but this could increase the danger in some situations. Other myths are that tornadoes can skip houses, always travel in a predictable direction, always extend visibly from the ground to the cloud, and increase in intensity with increasing width. Finally, some people believe that tornadoes only occur in North America, do not occur in winter, or that some areas are protected from tornadoes by rivers, mountains, valleys, tall buildings or other geographical or man-made features; the truth is that tornadoes can occur almost anywhere at any time if the conditions are right. Some geographic areas are simply more prone to these conditions than others.

Some tornado myths are remaining bits of folklore which are passed down by word of mouth. The idea that the southwest corner of a structure is the safest place in a tornado was first published in the 1800s and persisted until the 1990s despite being thoroughly debunked in the 1960s and 70s. One notable instance of mass media spreading a tornado myth was after the 1999 Oklahoma tornado outbreak, where TIME magazine ran a caption on a picture suggesting that highway overpasses were safer tornado shelters than houses. The spread of some myths can be attributed to popular tornado-themed movies such as The Wizard of Oz and Twister.

Safety

Safest location in a building

In 1887, the first book on tornadoes was written by John Park Finley, a pioneer in the field of tornado research. While it was a revolutionary book containing many breakthrough ideas, it contained a few ideas which have since been proven false. One of these was the idea that the northeast or east part of a structure was the least safe, and should be avoided when seeking shelter from a tornado.

This myth was derived from two misconceptions: First, that tornadoes always travel in a northeasterly direction, and second, that debris from a structure will be carried away in the direction of the tornado's propagation, leaving anyone taking shelter on the side of the structure facing the tornado's approach unharmed. The seriousness of these misconceptions began to be revealed in the 1960s and 1970s, when surveys of major tornado damage in residential areas showed that the section of a house in the direction of the tornado's approach is actually the  safe. Additionally, many tornadoes have traveled in directions other than northeasterly, including the Jarrell tornado (F5 on the Fujita scale), which moved south-southwesterly. Because determining a tornado's direction of approach can take time away from seeking shelter, official advice is to seek shelter in an interior room on the lowest floor of a building, under a staircase, I-beam, or sturdy piece of furniture if possible.

Opening windows to reduce tornado damage
One of the oldest pieces of tornado folklore is the idea that tornadoes do most of their damage due to the lower atmospheric pressure at the center of a tornado, which causes the house to explode outward. The supposition was that opening windows helps to equalize the pressure.

The source of this myth is from the appearance of some destroyed structures after violent tornadoes. When one wall receives the extreme pressure of tornado winds, it will likely collapse . This then leads to a considerable  pressure on the three remaining walls, which fall outwards as the roof falls down, creating the impression of a house which has exploded. Damage surveys of "exploded" houses usually show at least one wall which has blown inward. Additionally, if the roof is lifted before any walls fall, the walls can fall in any direction. If they fall outward, this structure can also appear to have exploded.

Not only can this difference be equalized in most structures in approximately three seconds, but if a significant pressure differential manages to form, the windows will break first, equalizing the pressure. Additionally, as the windows are the most fragile parts of a house, in a significant tornado flying debris will likely break enough windows to equalize any pressure difference fairly quickly. Regardless of any pressure drop, the direct effects of a tornado's winds are enough to cause damage to a house in all but the weakest tornadoes.

Current advice is that opening windows in advance of a tornado wastes time that could be spent seeking shelter. Also, being near windows is very dangerous during a severe weather event, possibly exposing people to flying glass.

Using highway overpasses as shelter

There are several documented cases of people surviving under highway overpasses, but scientists and meteorologists warn against using them for protection. From scientific lessons learned, meteorologists insist that overpasses are insufficient shelter from tornado winds and debris, and may be  to be during a violent tornado. The embankment under an overpass is higher than the surrounding terrain, and the wind speed increases with height. Additionally, the overpass design may create a "wind-tunnel" effect under the span, further increasing the wind speed. Many overpasses are completely exposed underneath and most lack hanging girders or a crawlspace-like area to provide sufficient protection from debris, which can travel at high speeds even in weak tornadoes. ( a highway underpass is close at hand, and  it has such deep crawlspaces behind sheltering girders, and  no better shelter is available in the face of imminent danger from a tornado, then this could be the best and most survivable option. Otherwise, an underpass is no shelter at all.) People stopping underneath overpasses block the flow of traffic, putting others in danger.

Escaping a tornado in a vehicle

Often people try to avoid or outrun a tornado in a vehicle. Although cars can travel faster than the average tornado, the directive from the National Weather Service is for house-dwellers in the path of a tornado to take shelter at home rather than risk an escape by vehicle. This is a result of several factors and statistics. An interior room inside a well-built frame house (especially one with a basement) provides a reasonable degree of protection from all but the most violent tornadoes. Underground or above-ground tornado shelters, as well as extremely strong structures such as bank vaults, offer almost complete protection. Cars, on the other hand, can be heavily damaged by even weak tornadoes, and in violent tornadoes they can be thrown large distances, even into buildings. High-profile vehicles such as buses and tractor trailers are even more vulnerable to high winds.

There are many reasons to avoid cars when a tornado is imminent. Severe thunderstorms which produce tornadoes can produce flooding rains, hail, and strong winds far from the tornado-producing area, all of which can make driving difficult or even impossible. Any of these situations can leave drivers stranded in the path of the tornado far from substantial shelter. When coupled with driver panic, they may also result in dangerous but preventable accidents. This situation would be magnified greatly if all the residents of a warned area left in their vehicles, which would cause traffic jams and accidents as the tornado approached. Numerous victims of the deadly Wichita Falls, Texas tornado on April 10, 1979, died in their vehicles in such a situation.

If a person spots a nearby tornado while driving, the official National Weather Service directive has been for the individual to abandon the car and seek shelter in a ditch or culvert, or substantial shelter if nearby. Far-away, highly visible tornadoes, however, can be successfully fled from at right angles (90-degrees) from its direction of apparent movement. Despite dangers inherent with operating a vehicle during a tornado, given sufficient advance warning, mobile home residents have been instructed by the National Weather Service to drive to the nearest secure shelter during a warning.

Tornado behavior

Tornadoes skipping houses
Several different phenomena have lent credence to the idea that tornadoes "skip" houses, like a person jumping over hurdles. Tornadoes vary in intensity along their path, sometimes drastically over a short period and distance. If a tornado was causing damage, then weakened to the point where it could cause no damage, followed by a re-intensification, it would appear as if it skipped a section. Occasionally with violent tornadoes, a smaller subvortex within a tornado will completely destroy a structure next to another building which appears almost unscathed and thus apparently skipped over.

It is true that a house that is between two destroyed homes can be undamaged, but this is not the result of a tornado skipping, as some previously thought. After the 1974 Super Outbreak, Ted Fujita studied many films of tornadoes from that day. Included in his review was damage and tornado film footage of F4 and F5 tornadoes. Fujita concluded that multiple vortices, highly volatile tornadic satellites transiting within a parent tornado at high speeds, are responsible for making tornadoes appear to skip houses. The phenomenon of satellite tornadoes, where a smaller tornado orbits a larger companion tornado, can also lead to gaps in damage between the two tornadoes.

Weaker tornadoes, and at times even stronger tornadoes, can occasionally lift, meaning their circulation ceases to affect the ground temporarily. The result is an erratic and discontinuous linear damage path, leading to the term skipping tornado. These discontinuities tend to occur over areas larger than the small neighborhoods where the house-skipping effect is observed, except possibly at the time of the birth and organization of the tornado. This situation is not commonly observed and the term is now rarely applied. Typically, when one tornado weakens and another forms, the process of successive parent mesocyclones forming and decaying is known as cyclic tornadogenesis, thus leading to a series of tornadoes spawned by the same supercell. This series of tornadoes is known as a tornado family.

Association of size with intensity

Some people have been led to assume that small, skinny tornadoes are always weaker than large, wedge-shaped tornadoes. There is an observed trend of wider tornadoes causing worse damage. It is unknown whether this is due to an actual tendency of tornado dynamics or an ability for the tornado to affect a larger area. However, this is not a reliable indicator of an individual tornado's intensity. Some small, rope-like tornadoes, traditionally thought of as weak, have been among the strongest in history. Also, tornadoes typically change shape during the course of their lifespan, further complicating any attempt to classify how dangerous a tornado is as it is occurring.

Appearing to reach the ground

It is commonly and mistakenly thought that if the condensation funnel of a tornado does not reach the ground, then the tornado cannot cause substantial damage. Furthermore, a tornado is sometimes believed to be on the ground only when its condensation funnel descends to the surface, but this assumption is misleading and extremely dangerous. The 2013 El Reno tornado is one such example which disproves both beliefs, as it featured an expansive and translucent outer circulation with an incomplete condensation funnel. The circular, violent surface winds (not the condensation funnel) are what both define the tornado and cause the tornado's damage. Spotters should keep sight of swirling debris directly under any visible funnel or rotating wall cloud, even if such structures appear to not descend entirely to the ground. Additionally, tornadoes can be wrapped in rain and thus may not be visible at all.

Direction of travel
It has been thought in the past that tornadoes moved almost exclusively in a northeasterly direction. This is false, and a potentially deadly myth which can lead to a false sense of security, especially for unaware spotters or chasers. Although the majority of tornadoes move northeast, this is normally due to the motion of the storm, and tornadoes can arrive from any direction. The expectation of northeasterly travel may be accurate in many cases, but is no more than a statistical observation about tornadoes in general that any particular tornado may defy at any time. A deadly F5 tornado that hit the city of Jarrell, Texas in 1997 moved to the southwestdirectly opposite of commonly expected storm motion. Another notable example is the 1990 Plainfield tornado, a significant and deadly F5 tornado that traveled from northwest-to-southeast. Additionally, tornadoes can shift without notice due to storm motion changes or effects on the tornado itself from factors such as its rear flank downdraft. This change of direction proved deadly in the 2013 El Reno tornado in which a 2.6 mile wide tornado shifted from an east direction to a northeast direction, killing four storm chasers. In addition, a 2008 tornado in Colorado moved in a very rare direction; this tornado moved in a southeast-to-northwest direction.

Geographical and temporal influences

Geographical scope

It is often thought that tornadoes only occur in North America. The majority of recorded tornadoes do occur in the United States; however, tornadoes have been observed on every continent except Antarctica.

Besides North America, Europe, Argentina, Australia, Bangladesh, and eastern India also experience tornadoes on a regular basis.

Near rivers, valleys, mountains, or other terrain features
There are many misconceptions involving the effect of terrain featuresbodies of water, mountains, valleys, and otherson tornado formation and behavior. While most modes of tornadogenesis are poorly understood, no terrain feature can prevent the occurrence of a tornado.

Small bodies of water such as lakes and rivers are insignificant obstacles to tornadoes. Violent tornadoes have formed over rivers and lakesincluding the 1878 Wallingford tornado and the 1899 New Richmond tornadoas well as crossing over them after forming elsewhere. More than a dozen tornadoes are reported to have crossed the Mississippi River. Strong tornadoes have also been known to cross the Detroit River and St. Clair River separating southeast Michigan and southwest Ontario.

These myths have been debunked. The devastating Tri-State Tornado crossed two major rivers along a record  or longer path. In 1944, a violent tornado cut a continuous path at least  through heavily forested and mountainous territory in West Virginia, killing at least 100 people. A hill known as Burnett's Mound on the southwest end of Topeka, Kansas was purported to protect the city from tornadoes, according to an old legend. However, in 1966, an F5 tornado passed directly over the hill through downtown, killing 18 people and causing $100 million (1966 USD) in damage. This myth continues to persist, and was further compounded by the fact that Burnett's Mound was rumored to be a burial ground of the Kansa Tribe, and that Topekans had committed sacrilege by attempting to build a water tower on the grounds immediately prior to the 1966 F5 tornado, despite strong opposition as a result of the myth. Downtown Memphis, Tennessee was believed by residents to be protected from tornadoes and other severe weather by the Chickasaw Bluff along the Mississippi River. During the 1974 Super Outbreak, violent tornadoes crossed dozens of rivers, including the Ohio, Detroit River as well as crossing over mountains and ridges hundreds of feet high. Another example of tornadoes hitting mountainous regions of the United States is the 2011 Super Outbreak, which hit mountainous parts of East Tennessee, Northeast Alabama, Southwest Virginia and North Georgia, killing many people, including an entire family of four in Ringgold, Georgia.

Attraction to mobile homes and/or trailer parks

The idea that manufactured housing units, or mobile homes, attract tornadoes has been around for decades. This may appear to be true at first from looking at tornado fatality statistics: from 2000 to 2008, 539 people were killed by tornadoes in the US, with more than half (282) of those deaths in mobile homes. Only around 6.8% of homes in the US are "manufactured/mobile homes".

However, it is highly unlikely that single-story structures such as mobile homes can have a substantial effect on tornado development or evolution. More people are killed in trailer parks because mobile homes are less able to withstand high winds than permanent structures. Winds which can demolish or roll a mobile home may only cause roof damage to a typical one- or two-family permanent residence. Another likely contributing factor to the continued propagation of this myth is confirmation bias: whenever a new instance of a tornado hitting a mobile home park occurs, media outlets report on it more extensively, ignoring damage to the surrounding area which may not have produced as many casualties.

Downtown areas

Some people believe that, for various reasons, large cities cannot be struck by tornadoes. More than 100 tornadoes have been reported to strike downtown areas of large cities. Many cities have been struck twice or more, and a fewincluding Lubbock, Texas; Regina, Saskatchewan; St. Louis, Missouri; Topeka, Kansas; and London, Englandhave been struck by violent tornadoes (F4 or stronger).

Tornadoes may seem rare in downtown areas because downtown areas cover such a small geographical area. Considering the size of a central business district is very small compared to the city limits, tornadoes will strike outside of the downtown area more often.

The misconception, like most, has a small basis in truth. Research has been done in a few metropolitan areas suggesting that the urban heat island effect may discourage the formation of weak tornadoes in city centers, due to turbulent warm air disrupting their formation. This does not apply to significant tornadoes, however, and it is possible that the presence of tall buildings may actually  storms which move into downtown areas.

During winter

Because they generally require warm weather to form, tornadoes are uncommon in winter in the mid-latitudes. However, they can form, and tornadoes have even been known to travel over snow-covered surfaces. Deadly tornadoes are no exception: from 2000 to 2008, 135 of the 539 US tornado deaths occurred during meteorological winter (December through February). Tornadoes in winter may be more dangerous, since they tend to move faster than tornadoes at other times of the year.

See also 
 List of common misconceptions
 List of F5 and EF5 tornadoes
 List of tornadoes and tornado outbreaks
 List of tornadoes striking downtown areas
 Tornado records
 Shape of tornadoes
 Size of tornadoes
 Tornadoes of 
 List of tornadoes by calendar day

References

External links 
 Tornado Myths and Facts National Climatic Data Center
 Video comparing houses with open and closed doors in high winds - though construction is also different

Tornado
Tornadoes